Michael Murphy (born 1959) is an Irish former hurler.  At club level he played with Templederry Kenyons and was also a member of the Tipperary senior hurling team. He usually lined out as a forward.

Career

Murphy first played juvenile and underage hurling with the Templederry Kenyons club before joining the club's top adult team. He had some divisional success, winning a North Tipperary Intermediate Championship title. Murphy first appeared on the inter-county scene with the Tipperary minor team that won the All-Ireland Minor Championship in 1976. He progressed onto the Tipperary under-21 team and won back-to-back All-Ireland Under-21 Championship titles from three consecutive finals appearances between 1978 and 1980. Murphy subsequently made a number of league and championship appearances with the Tipperary senior hurling team and was part of the National Hurling League-winning side in 1979.

Honours

Killenaule
North Tipperary Intermediate Hurling Championship: 1979

Tipperary
National Hurling League: 1978-79
All-Ireland Under-21 Hurling Championship: 1979, 1980
Munster Under-21 Hurling Championship: 1978, 1979, 1980
All-Ireland Minor Hurling Championship: 1976
Munster Minor Hurling Championship: 1976

References

External link

 Michael Murphy profile on Tipp GAA Archives website

1959 births
Living people
Irish farmers
Templederry Kenyons hurlers
Tipperary inter-county hurlers